Christoph Saurer (born 22 January 1986, in Vienna) is an Austrian footballer who plays for SC Pinkafeld. He has been capped for both the Austria national under-21 football team and the Austrian full international team.

External links
Roster - LASK
Player profile - Austria Archive

1986 births
Living people
Austrian footballers
Austria international footballers
FK Austria Wien players
LASK players
SK Rapid Wien players
SC Wiener Neustadt players
Austrian Football Bundesliga players

Association football midfielders
Footballers from Vienna
Austria youth international footballers
Austria under-21 international footballers
FC Juniors OÖ players
FC Wacker Innsbruck (2002) players